The Algeciras campaign, or Battles of Algeciras, was a brief naval campaign fought between a combined French and Spanish Navy force and a British Royal Navy force during 4–13 July 1801. A French squadron, seeking to join the Spanish fleet and a number of French ships of the line at the Spanish Atlantic base of Cadiz, sailed from Toulon on 13 June under Contre-amiral Charles Linois. Rounding the British naval base of Gibraltar on the southern coast of Spain on 4 July, Linois learned that a British squadron under Rear-Admiral Sir James Saumarez was on station off Cadiz. Seeking to avoid battle with Saumarez's much larger force, Linois anchored in the Spanish port of Algeciras, close to Gibraltar. Saumarez discovered Linois there on 6 July and attacked at 08:30, his ships hampered by light winds and Linois's strong defensive position.

During the battle, in which the French squadron was heavily supported by fire from Spanish shore batteries and gunboats, the British ship HMS Hannibal grounded and could not be refloated. Two of the French ships were also driven ashore, but the fire of the Spanish batteries and the lack of wind all contributed to Saumarez calling off the attack at 13:35, leaving Hannibal stranded and isolated. Captain Solomon Ferris was left with no option but to surrender as the remainder of the British force limped back to Gibraltar.

Linois called on the Spanish forces in Cadiz for reinforcements and on 9 July a relief squadron was sent consisting of six ships of the line and two frigates under . Arriving on 9 July, this force anchored in Algeciras until Linois was ready to sail on 12 July, the large combined squadron departing westwards with the wind during the evening. Saumarez followed, sending HMS Superb to attack the Spanish rearguard. During the opening stages of the second battle Superb set the 112-gun Spanish ship Real Carlos on fire and captured the French Saint Antoine. Real Carlos later drifted into the San Hermenegildo, spreading the fire to her compatriot. Both ships exploded at 00:15 on 13 July with enormous loss of life.

The British squadron pressed on with the attack, and at 05:15 on 13 July HMS Venerable and HMS Thames attacked the French Formidable off the Spanish coast. In a fierce engagement, Formidable brought down Venerable's masts and drove the ship on shore, the French ship escaping with the rest of the squadron to Cadiz.  Venerable was later salvaged and returned to Gibraltar, while Saumarez reinstated the British blockade of Cadiz.

First Battle of Algeciras

British squadron
The British squadron was formed from the force enforcing the Cadiz blockade to ensure that the Spanish fleet stationed there did not put to sea. One ship from the squadron was absent during the battle; HMS Superb had been detached to the Guadalquivir River and, along with the frigate HMS Thames, did not reach Algeciras in time to participate, turning back to Cadiz on 6 July and observing the later movements of the combined squadron. All of the British squadron was heavily engaged, but Hannibal and Pompée, isolated at the head of the British line by calm winds, took the heaviest damage. Pompée had to be towed to safety by the boats of the squadron and Hannibal was grounded and eventually forced to surrender. Between them Pompée and Hannibal took more than half of the total British casualties.

French squadron
Linois's squadron was well defended, situated in a strong position and covered by Spanish forts and gunboats augmented by shore parties from the French ships, which were carrying more than 1,500 French soldiers. The ships of the line were all heavily engaged, with Desaix and Indomptable driven ashore and Formidable also badly damaged. All three required extensive repairs before they were seaworthy. Murion was close inshore and thus only lightly damaged, but the Spanish batteries, gunboats and the town of Algeciras itself all suffered severe damage.

Second Battle of Algeciras

British squadron
Saumarez's squadron was all suffering from the effects of the first battle, especially Caesar which had had its masts replaced in just four days. Pompée was so badly damaged that Saumarez abandoned the ship in the Gibraltar dockyards and redistributed the crew throughout the squadron. The only fresh ships were Superb and Thames, which had rejoined the squadron on 10 July after shadowing the combined squadron's approach to Algeciras. In the battle, only Superb, Venerable and Thames were engaged, the other ships trailing too far behind the combined squadron to play an active role in the combat, although their presence did discourage Moreno from continuing the battle on the morning of 13 July.

French and Spanish squadron
The combined squadron was formed on 9 July by the merger of Linois's battered force at Algeciras and Moreno's relief force. It totaled five Spanish ships of the line and four French and was much larger than its British opponent. However, all of Linois's ships were badly damaged from the first battle and the captured Hannibal was so battered that Moreno ordered it to return to Algeciras with the frigate Indienne on 12 July. Neither took any part in the battle. Much of the combined squadron was not engaged in the second battle, managing to escape Saumarez's pursuit and reach Cadiz safely. The rearguard of Rear Carlos, San Hermengildo and Saint Antoine was overwhelmed in the night however and Formidable only escaped after a fierce engagement on the Spanish coast the following morning.

References

Bibliography
 
 
 
 
 
 

Naval battles involving France
Naval battles involving Spain
Naval battles involving the United Kingdom
Conflicts in 1801
French Revolutionary Wars orders of battle